Dr. Jenner's House, formerly known as the Edward Jenner Museum, in Berkeley, England, is housed in a grade II* listed early 18th century building called the Chantry, famous as the home of Edward Jenner FRS, physician, surgeon and pioneer of smallpox vaccination, and now used as a museum.

History
The Chantry was built in the village of Berkeley in the early 18th century and gained its name from being built on land associated with a former community of monks, next to the village church. Edward Jenner bought the property, owned by the Weston family, in 1785, and moved there before his marriage to Catherine Kingscote in 1788. Jenner planted ivy that in later years grew up the sides of the adjacent church tower, and a grapevine in a vinery built against the Chantry. He also had the Reverend Mr Ferryman build a rustic hut at the bottom of the garden where Jenner treated the poorer families in the district. Jenner later did vaccinations in it and referred to it as "the Temple of Vaccinia". Jenner was living at the Chantry when he conducted the first ever vaccinations in 1796 and 1798 which showed the potential for the control smallpox. Although Jenner briefly maintained homes in Cheltenham and London the Chantry remained his principal residence until his death in 1823. In 1876 Jenner's descendants sold the house to the Church of England, who used it as the local vicarage.

Museum

In 1985 the Chantry was purchased by the Edward Jenner Museum, dedicated to the work of the doctor and wider immunology; the Japanese businessman Ryoichi Sasakawa donated a significant sum to enable the acquisition. Restoration work was gradually carried out over the following years, allowing more of the building to be opened to the public.

The chantry building holds grade II* listed status, as does the rustic "Temple of Vaccinia" in the garden.

References

Bibliography

External links 
 Dr. Jenner’s House

Grade II* listed houses
Historic house museums in Gloucestershire
Jenner
Museum
Grade II* listed buildings in Gloucestershire
Medical museums in England
Berkeley, Gloucestershire